William Lawrence or Laurence  (–1798) was a British politician who sat in the House of Commons on three occasions between 1761 and 1798.
 
Lawrence was the second son of Captain Thomas Laurence RN and his wife Elizabeth Soulden, daughter of Gabriel Soulden, merchant, of Kinsale, county Cork. He married Anna Sophia Aislabie, daughter of William Aislabie of Studley Royal, near Ripon, Yorkshire, on 21 November 1759.

Lawrence was returned as Member of Parliament for Ripon in the  1761 general election  on his father-in-law's interest. In 1768, Charles Allanson (Aislabie's other son-in law) was returned at Ripon instead and Lawrence did not stand for Parliament again until he was returned at a by-election 30 October 1775 after Allanson died.

In 1780 Lawrence was not put up for election again by his father-in-law for unknown reasons. However Aislabie died in the following year and Lawrence, having gained control of the borough, took his empty seat at Ripon in a by-election on 5 June 1781. He was returned for Ripon unopposed in 1784, 1790 and 1796. There is no record of his having spoken in the House.

Lawrence died on 2 September 1798 aged 75. His daughter subsequently upheld the family interest in Ripon.

References

1720s births
1798 deaths
British MPs 1761–1768
British MPs 1774–1780
British MPs 1780–1784
British MPs 1784–1790
British MPs 1790–1796
British MPs 1796–1800
Members of the Parliament of Great Britain for English constituencies